dabs.com was an e-commerce retailer in the United Kingdom. It was one of the UK's largest internet retailers of IT and technology products. From 2006 until its closure in 2016, it was a subsidiary of BT Group.

History

As an independent company
Originally Dabs Press, from 1987 to 1990, and Dabs Direct, it primarily sold its products via advertisements in IT related magazines. dabs.com was founded in Bolton by David Atherton and Bruce Smith in 1987; Dabs is an acronym of the initials of the founders' names. It subsequently grew to employ more than 200 people, with annual revenue of £200m from 5000 transactions daily.

Dabs.com was a shirt sponsor of Fulham FC for the 2003–04 and 2004–05 seasons.

BT takeover

In April 2006, it was announced that BT Group had purchased dabs.com for an estimated £30m and that the business would become a wholly owned subsidiary of BT.

The company's operations in France were subsequently closed at the end of May 2006.

Closure

In April 2016 the dabs.com brand was phased out in favour of the BT Shop brand (for consumers) and BT Business Direct (for business customers). This included the closure of the dabs.ie website for the Republic of Ireland and the end of consumer-oriented sales there on the same date.

References

External links
 BT Business Direct (formally dabs4work.com) official website for businesses
 Unified communications provided by BT Business Direct
 dabs4work.ie official website for businesses in Ireland
 dabs.com reviews
 Review of 2010 Dabs.com Live Gadget Show in London

Online retailers of the United Kingdom
Consumer electronics retailers of the United Kingdom
BT Group